Thettawshay Thihapate was governor of Taungdwin from the 1360s to  during the late Pinya and early Ava periods. After Pinya fell to King Thado Minbya of Sagaing in 1364, he became one of several Pinya vassals that refused to submit to the new king, who went on to found the Ava Kingdom in 1365. He finally submitted to Thado Minbya in 1366 after his town came under siege by Ava forces. He became a loyal vassal of Ava afterwards, and participated in Ava's military campaigns to the early 1390s. He was the father of Queen Shin Myat Hla, the chief queen consort of King Mohnyin Thado.

Brief
Thettawshay Thihapate made his first appearance in the royal chronicles as the governor of Taungdwin, then a vassal state of Pinya, in 1364. He was one of the several vassal rulers of Pinya that refused to submit to Thado Minbya of Sagaing, who had captured Pinya in 1364, and founded the Ava Kingdom in 1365 as the successor state of the Pinya and Sagaing kingdoms.

His independent rule lasted until late 1366 when Thado Minbya showed up with an army. Thihapate had prepared for a long siege since Thado Minbya took Nganwegon (modern Pyinmana), southeast of Taungdwin, earlier in the year. Confident of his  defenses, Thihapate still refused to submit. Initially the defenses held; Taungdwin's skilled archers behind the high walls repeatedly held off charges by Ava forces. However, the Ava command was able to assassinate the commander of Taungdwin's archery battalion. (The assassination was carried out by Nga Tet Pya, an accomplished thief-turned-commander, who had breached the Taungdwin army's quarters after having scaled the walls at night.) The assassination broke the morale of Taungdwin's defenses. The rebel governor subsequently agreed to submit to Thado Minbya in exchange for keeping his office at Taungdwin.

Thihapate would remain a loyal vassal afterwards. He readily submitted to the next king of Ava, Swa Saw Ke, after Thado Minbya's sudden death in 1367, and was reappointed to his post by the new king in 1368. He dutifully participated in Ava's military campaigns between 1385 and 1393, leading his own Taungdwin regiment. His long tenure ended  when the new king Minkhaung I appointed a new governor at Taungdwin. He was still alive in 1402/03 according to a contemporary inscription at the Myazigon Pagoda in Kyaukpadaung, describing his donation at the pagoda. It is unclear if he was still alive in 1409/10 when his daughter Shin Myat Hla briefly became a junior queen of Minkhaung for five months, or in 1410 when she was married off to Commander Thado by the king himself.

The governor of Taungdwin is remembered through his progeny. Through Myat Hla, who became the chief queen consort of Ava in 1426, all the kings of Ava from 1439 to 1527 were his descendants. Also through Myat Hla, Thihapate was a nine times great-grandfather of King Alaungpaya, the founder of Konbaung dynasty.

List of military campaigns
The following is a list of military campaigns in which he went to the front as part of the Ava armed forces. His 1364–1366/67 rebellion against King Thado Minbya is not included.

Notes

References

Bibliography

 
 
 
 
 
 

Pinya dynasty
Ava dynasty